Boyne was launched at Philadelphia in 1779, possibly under that name. She first appeared in Lloyd's Register as Boyne in 1789, but had probably been purchased in 1787 and had already made one voyage by 1789. She made three voyages in all as a slave ship before a French privateer captured her in 1794 on her fourth.

Slave voyage #1 (1788-1789)
Captain John Hay sailed from London on 8 February 1788, bound for the Gold Coast. Boyne started gathering slaves at Cape Coast Castle on 21 June. She left Africa on 4 March 1789 and arrived at St John's, Antigua. She had embarked 330 slaves and she landed 311, for a loss rate of 5.8%.

Boyne appears in Lloyd's Register in 1789 with J. Hays, master, changing to G. Greaves, and owner A. Willcock. She had been coppered in 1787, and underwent a good repair in 1789.

Slave voyage #2 (1789-1791)
Captain George Greaves sailed from Liverpool on 16 December 1789, bound for the Gold Coast. Boyne gathered slaves at Cape Coast Castle and left Africa 3 February 1791. She delivered her slaves to St John's in April. She had embarked 300 slaves and she landed 268, for a loss rate of 10.7%. Boyne returned to Liverpool on 7 June.

Slave voyage #3 (1791–1792)
Captain John Thornborrow sailed from Liverpool on 27 October 1791. She started gathering slaves at Calabar on 28 December, and left Africa on 7 April 1792. She arrived at Grenada on 24 June, where she landed 279 slaves. At some point Captain James Bowie replaced Thornborrow. Boyne left Grenada on 16 July and arrived back at Liverpool on 22 August. She had left Liverpool with 22 crew members and she suffered three crew deaths on the voyage.

Capture
War with France broke out in early 1793. Lloyd's Register for 1794 showed Boynes master changing from Thornburgh to J. Mill, and her owner as J.E. Colley. Captain John Mills acquired a letter of marque on 16 June 1794. Boyne sailed from Liverpool on 28 June 1794.

The French Naïade-class brig-corvette , captured Boyne, Mill, master, off Cape Clear as Boyne was sailing from Liverpool for Africa. Fraternité was armed with twelve 18-pounder guns and six swivel guns. She also had a crew of 146 men.

Notes

Citations

References
 
 

1779 ships
Ships built in the United States
Age of Sail merchant ships of the United States
Age of Sail merchant ships of England
Liverpool slave ships
Captured ships